Leslie Robinson (2 May 1898 – 1965) was an English footballer who played as a inside right.

Career
Robinson began his career at non-league club Stirling Athletic, after serving for the Essex Regiment in World War I. Robinson signed for West Ham United in the 1920–21 season. Robinson's time at West Ham was spent between the first team and the reserves, making 19 Football League appearances, scoring twice. In 1924, Robinson signed for Northampton Town, scoring 32 times in 73 appearances. In June 1927, Robinson joined Norwich City, making 31 appearances, scoring ten times. The following year, Robinson moved back to east London, signing for newly formed Thames. Robinson only stayed at the club for one season, signing for Torquay United in July 1929. Robinson scored 16 times in 23 appearances for the club.

References

1898 births
1965 deaths
Military personnel from Essex
Association football forwards
English footballers
Footballers from Romford
Essex Regiment soldiers
West Ham United F.C. players
Northampton Town F.C. players
Norwich City F.C. players
Thames A.F.C. players
Torquay United F.C. players
English Football League players
British Army personnel of World War I